Hommerts is a small village in Súdwest-Fryslân in the province of Friesland, the Netherlands. It had a population of around 650 in January 2017. It forms, together with Jutrijp, the double village  De Hommerts-Jutryp.

History
The village was first mentioned in the 13th century as Humerke, and means border land of probably Huga (person). Hommerts is a linear canal village. Between 1843 and 1844, the road Sneek-Lemmer was built, and the village extended towards to road.

The Dutch Reformed church was built in 1876, and replaces a 1741 church which in turn replaced a predecessor probably from the 12th century. The tower dates from 1985, because it was destroyed by a lightning strike.

Hommerts was home to 322 people in 1840. Before 2011, the village was part of the Wymbritseradiel municipality.

Gallery

References

External links

Súdwest-Fryslân
Populated places in Friesland